The 2019–20 season was Sivasspor's 53rd year in existence. In addition to the domestic league, Sivasspor participated in the Turkish Cup.

Squad

Süper Lig

League table

Results summary

Results by round

Matches

References
 

Sivasspor seasons
Turkish football clubs 2019–20 season